Ganges is a nature documentary series for television on the natural history of the River Ganges in India and Bangladesh. As well as the variety of animals and habitats that are to be found along the river's 2,510 km (1,557 mi) reach, the programmes also feature the cultures, traditions and religions of the very large human population that it supports. For Hindus, the Ganges is a sacred river and a place of pilgrimage, a deep influence on their religion and culture as well as being their lifeblood. Over the course of three episodes, the series is presented as a journey from the source of the river in the high Himalaya to its delta at the Bay of Bengal.

Ganges is narrated by actor/playwright Sudha Bhuchar and produced by the BBC Natural History Unit, in association with the Travel Channel and France 3. The series producer is Ian Gray. It was first broadcast on BBC Two in August 2007 and formed part of the BBC's "India and Pakistan '07" season, marking the 60th anniversary of independence from British rule and the partitioning of India and Pakistan.

The format was previously used by the BBC for earlier documentary series on the world's major river systems, including Congo (2001) and Nile (2004).

Episodes

1. "Daughter of the Mountains"
The first of the programmes, taking the legendary mythology surrounding the Ganges seriously, shows how the natural world and the spiritual world have always been entwined in Hindu thought and life, and explains how the gift of life that the river brings is the reason she is held is such high reverence.

The film gradually follows the Ganges back along its course, ascending further into the Himalayan mountains, and encountering some of the fabled sources of the Ganges, and most Holy pilgrimage centres along the way.

Beginning at Kedarnath as the thaw sets in during May and 100,000s of pilgrims start their annual ascent, we go up through Yamunotri – not the source of the Ganges but of its sister the Yamuna – Badrinath, which has one of the holiest temples on the route, and up to Gangotri.

But geographically this is also not the source and the film follows the path up past Gaumukh and on to the Tapovan meadows, which is identified, at least here, as the true source of the river.

All along this route we get glimpses of the varied wildlife that make their home here, from rare photography of the snow leopard in the mountains, to the lammergeier which, with its 3-metre wingspan, is one of the largest birds of prey, and the langur or Hanuman monkeys in the huge deodar trees.

It also visits Nandadevi, the second highest peak in India, and the Valley of Flowers which lies in its foothills, and has over 600 plant species, including the Himalayan balsam which in spring cloaks the valley in pink, and we also see something of the bird-life that thrives in the valley.

The film then shows the effects of the monsoon hail storms and rains, which give the river half of its flow-waters in just a few weeks, and helps wash down an astonishing 2 billion tons of sediment into the plains of India, making it the most fertile soil on Earth.

The film ends by following the river down from Devprayag, where the Alakananda and Bhagirathi rivers converge and the Ganges finally is identified as a separate river, and through the Holy cities of Rishikesh and Haridwar.

2. "River of Life"
The story of the river is taken up in this episode as it leaves the Himalayan foothills and enters the swamplands known as the Terai, here there are grasses that can grow 4 metres a year – so large they can even hide elephants.

Other creatures also live in the Terai swamplands: Indian rhinoceros and Bengal tiger towards the East; in central India, along the Chambal river, birds like the bar-headed goose, ruddy shelduck (also called brahminy duck), spoonbill and Indian skimmer are found. We also see the critically endangered species of crocodile, the gharial, a strict fishetarian with a long, narrow snout.

The monsoon when it comes brings back life to the river which has been drying up during the hot season and washes down an enormous amount of sediment from the mountains producing muds and soils that are estimated to be 3 miles deep in certain places.

In the rice bowls that this fertile land produces we can see domestic birds like ducks, who help clean and fertilise the rice fields; and the sarus crane, which is the largest flying bird on earth, and its courtship dances.

Emphasis is placed on the Hindu respect for all life forms, even dangerous ones like the cobra, which in certain villages are allowed to roam freely throughout the compounds; and the mischievous macaques who are quite violent when in search of food.

This is contrasted with the devastation caused first by the Moghuls and their hunting practices, and even more so by the British, who not only hunted, but also destroyed habitats wholesale in their greed for commerce.

The team also visit the Sonepur Mela in Bihar, the largest livestock fair in India, where cattle, horses and elephants, some of which can sell for up to BPS 10,000; and see villagers fighting off wild elephants in packs of up to 100 in Bengal.

This episode closes by tracing the branch river, the Hooghly, as it flows through Kolkata, and looks at the effect large scale populations are having on the river itself, with their ever-increasing pollution, and asks whether the river, and its inhabitants like the Ganges river dolphin, can survive the onslaught.

3. "Waterland"
Having watched the rise of the Ganges in the Himalayas and its flow through the plains of India, in the final episode we see the effect the river has when it meets the Bay of Bengal and forms the largest delta system in the world.

The delta itself straddles both India and Bangladesh, part of which is the world's largest mangrove swamp, the Sunderbans, which is home not only to giant Asian honey bees, which provide a bountiful harvest of honey for those brave enough to enter the swamp, but also to aggressive man-eating tigers which take many lives each year.

The film follows a scientific team as they tranquillise and place a tracking-collar on a tigress, and follow her journeys through the swamps and temporary villages they hold in a hope of understanding more of how they live and survive in such inhospitable lands.

The swamp also plays home to many other creatures, from mud-skippers, who are thoroughly adopted to their environment, and can use their fins to walk on dry land, to otters which are bred by fishermen and help drive fish into their nets. Astonishingly an otter may sell for up to US$100 they are so useful to the fishermen.

The delta itself is also home to the largest density of human population of earth, in a land around the size of Britain, six times more people find their living, and all thanks to the river, which not only brings water, but also fertile mud to the area making 3 rice crops a year possible.

We watch the changes the land undergoes through the dry season, where water levels can drop as much as 6 metres in 6 months, and into the rainy season, where water levels dramatically rise causing animals and humans alike to migrate as erosion takes its toll.

The documentary ends by wondering once again whether the river can survive as populations increase, drinking and using up the precious water as it flows through the land, and sees hope in the reverence the river has always commanded from the Hindu religion and its adherents, as we watch 1,000,000 pilgrims gather at Sagar Island to give thanks to the river before it enters the sea.

External links
 
 

BBC television documentaries
Documentary films about nature
2000s British documentary television series
2007 British television series debuts
2007 British television series endings
Ganges
Films set in Uttarakhand
Films shot in Uttarakhand